Dorothy Tristan (May 9, 1934 – January 7, 2023) was an American actress and screenwriter. She was best known for her roles in the films Klute, Down and Out in Beverly Hills, and Scarecrow. She co-wrote the films Steal the Sky and Weeds. She also wrote the films Suspended Animation, which is based on her novel, and A Piece of Eden. Tristan started her career as a model and was on the magazine covers of Vogue and Life. In 1957, she married her first husband, Aram Avakian. They divorced in 1972. A couple of years before that, she made her film debut in End of the Road, which was made by Avakian. In 1975, she married John D. Hancock and they would collaborate on films like Weeds. 

On January 7, 2023, she died in La Porte, Indiana, of complications from Alzheimer's disease. She was 88.

Filmography

References

External links

1934 births
2023 deaths
20th-century American actresses
American women screenwriters
Actresses from New York City
Screenwriters from New York (state)